Chandrapal Singh (born 8 September 1994) is an Indian cricketer. He made his List A debut for Rajasthan in the 2013–14 Vijay Hazare Trophy on 27 February 2014. He made his first-class debut on 19 January 2020, for Rajasthan in the 2019–20 Ranji Trophy.

References

External links
 

1994 births
Living people
Indian cricketers
Rajasthan cricketers
Cricketers from Rajasthan